Shankweiler's Drive-In Theatre is a single-screen drive-in movie theater located off of Route 309 in Orefield, Pennsylvania, United States. It is the oldest operational drive-in theater in the world It generally operates during weekends in the colder months, while playing films seven days per week during the summer season. Admission gives patrons access to both nightly movie showings.

History 

Shankweiler's was opened by Wilson Shankweiler on April 15, 1934, making it the first drive-in theater to open in the state of Pennsylvania and the second drive-in theater to open in the entire United States. It opened less than one year after the first ever American drive-in theater opened in Camden, New Jersey.

In 1948, Shankweiler's installed speaker poles and car speakers. Hurricane Diane in 1955 caused severe damage to the screen and projection booth at Shankweiler's, prompting the construction of a new snack bar / projection booth and installation of a new CinemaScope movie screen.

Shankweiler sold his drive-in in 1965 to Robert Malkames. Under Malkames' ownership, the theater in 1982 adopted micro-vicinity AM radio broadcasting to deliver movie soundtracks to patrons, though the car speakers remained in place.

Malkames sold Shankweiler's to Paul and Susan Geissinger in 1984. Under the ownership of the Geissingers in 1986, Shankweiler's became the first drive-in theater to deliver movie audio via FM broadcast stereo. Later, Shankweiler's sound system got an upgrade in 2002, followed by another upgrade that brought fully digital video projection and sound equipment in 2013.

In 2015, the Geissingers listed Shankweiler's Drive-In for sale, and then re-listed it for sale in 2018, with an asking price of $1.2 million.

In November 2022, the theater was sold to Matthew McClanahan and Lauren McChesney, of The Moving Picture Cinema, a mobile movie theater based out of Allentown, Pennsylvania. The theater resumed operations and is now open year-round.

References 

1934 establishments in Pennsylvania